Haitam Aleesami (born 31 July 1991) is a Norwegian professional footballer who plays as a left-back for Cypriot club Apollon Limassol and the Norway national team.

Club career
Aleesami was born in Oslo and started playing football for Holmlia SK and later Skeid. He joined Skeid's first-team squad in 2010, playing in the Second Division, and was named "Skeid's best young player of the year" in 2011.

In August 2012, he joined Fredrikstad FK to replace Benjamin Dahl Hagen who had returned to Vålerenga after a loan-spell. Aleesami made his debut in Tippeligaen and assisted Tarik Elyounoussi's goal when Fredrikstad won 2–0 in the match against Tromsø on 5 August 2012.

On 18 August 2014, he signed a four-year contract with Swedish club IFK Göteborg. He joined the club in the pre-season before the 2015 season.

On 8 August 2016, he signed with Palermo.

On 17 October 2020, he joined Russian Premier League club FC Rostov. He left Rostov on 19 May 2021.

On 16 August 2021, he signed a two-year contract with Apollon Limassol in Cyprus.

Career statistics

Club

International

Honours

IFK Göteborg
 Svenska Cupen: 2014–15

References

1991 births
Living people
Footballers from Oslo
Association football fullbacks
Association football wingers
Norwegian footballers
Norway international footballers
Association football defenders
Holmlia SK players
Skeid Fotball players
Fredrikstad FK players
IFK Göteborg players
Palermo F.C. players
Amiens SC players
FC Rostov players
Apollon Limassol FC players
Eliteserien players
Norwegian First Division players
Allsvenskan players
Serie A players
Serie B players
Ligue 1 players
Russian Premier League players
Norwegian people of Moroccan descent
Norwegian expatriate footballers
Expatriate footballers in Italy
Expatriate footballers in Sweden
Expatriate footballers in Russia
Expatriate footballers in France
Expatriate footballers in Cyprus
Norwegian expatriate sportspeople in Sweden
Norwegian expatriate sportspeople in Italy
Norwegian expatriate sportspeople in France
Norwegian expatriate sportspeople in Russia
Norwegian expatriate sportspeople in Cyprus